"Asshole" is a song by American comedian Denis Leary, released as the only single from his album No Cure for Cancer in 1993.

Song information
The chorus of the song is often used in The Howard Stern Show and was also used (along with the opening guitar riff) on The Morning Show with Ed Lover, Doctor Dré and Lisa G. on New York's WQHT Hot 97 for a brief period in the mid-1990s as the backdrop for a weekly segment called "The Jackass Wall". On the Australian TV show The Chaser's War on Everything, it was parodied with a song called "Ass Sol", making fun of Sol Trujillo, the controversial American then-CEO of Australian telecommunications provider Telstra.

The song made MuchMusic's "50 Most Controversial Videos of All Time" and reached spot  37 for its profanity, making fun of disabled people, and threatening to destroy the environment. The word "asshole" is said at least 27 times, according to MuchMusic's Devon Soltendieck. The word "fuck" is said four times; "piss" is used three times. "Goddamn" is also uttered. A censored video for the song was made, which bleeps out some words. However the word "asshole" is still present and uncensored.

In a 2008 appearance on The Opie and Anthony Show, comedian Louis CK claimed that Leary stole his "I'm an asshole" routine, which was then expanded upon and turned into a hit song by Leary. On a later episode of the same show, Leary challenged this assertion by claiming that he (Leary) co-wrote the song with Chris Phillips.

The song was adapted by Leary for use in a Holsten Pils advertisement on British TV which was against drunk driving. Leary appeared in the advert which is about a man who drinks and drives with his family in the car.

In 1999, a Dutch version ('Eikel') was recorded by the Dutch comedy duo 'Lebbis en Jansen'.

Reception
The song became a minor hit in the United States, with the music video gaining airplay on MTV and MuchMusic in a censored form. In Australia, the song became a hit; it reached No. 2 on the ARIA Singles Chart, ended 1994 as Australia's 26th most successful single, earned a Platinum sales certification, and was voted No. 1 on the Triple J Hottest 100 poll of 1993. The song also found some success in New Zealand, where it peaked at No. 22 on the RIANZ Singles Chart, and in the United Kingdom, reaching No. 58 on the UK Singles Chart in January 1996.

Later version
On August 3, 2016, Leary appeared on the US talk show The Late Late Show with James Corden, during which he performed an updated version of the song in character as Bill Clinton, in duet with James Corden playing a caricature of US Presidential candidate Hillary Clinton and criticizing rival candidate Donald Trump. For broadcast, the "-hole" part of the title was bleeped, a fact that is discussed by Leary and Corden during the song.

Charts

Weekly charts

Year-end charts

Certifications

References

1993 singles
1993 songs
A&M Records singles
Comedy rock songs
Denis Leary songs
Music controversies
Songs written by Pebe Sebert